Kenneth Hector Kilrea (June 4, 1940 – January 19, 2008) was a Canadian football player who played for the Hamilton Tiger-Cats and Saskatchewan Roughriders. He won the Grey Cup with the Tiger-Cats in 1963. He played college football at the University of South Carolina. He died of cancer 2008.

References

1940 births
2008 deaths
Hamilton Tiger-Cats players
Saskatchewan Roughriders players